Vladimir Dvorniković (28 July 1888 – 30 September 1956) was an ethnic Croat and politically  Yugoslav philosopher, ethno-psychologist, and a strong proponent of a Yugoslav ethnicity. He was a professor at the University of Zagreb during the 1920s. Dvorniković was also an advocate of psychologism and animal philosophy. He is best known for authoring the book "Characterology of the Yugoslavs."

Biography
Vladimir Dvorniković was born in Severin na Kupi, at the time in the Kingdom of Croatia and Slavonia, Austria-Hungary.
His father Ljudevit-Lujo was a pedagogue, and his mother Marjana was also an educator and a part-time publicist. Vladimir was the eldest of eleven children. Because of constant relocating due primarily to his parents' career, he finished elementary school in Drežnik, and high school in Zemun and Sarajevo. In the 3rd year of high school he became interested in literature and was an enthusiastic reader of the works of Herbert Spencer and Ernst Haeckel.

In 1906 Dvorniković traveled abroad to study philosophy in Vienna. Professors who had a tremendous influence on young Vladimir were Friedrich Jodl (1849-1914) and Wilhelm Jerusalem. He received his doctorate from Vienna in 1911 with his thesis titled "About the necessity of the psychological establishment of the cognitive theory." His plans on habilitation in Vienna were hindered due to the outbreak of the first World War. From 1910 and on he relocates to Sarajevo, Bihać, and Zagreb to commit to teaching.

Apart from the dissertation, he profiles himself as a psychologist with the book "Both essential types of philosophizing - Attempt of psychological orientation in current philosophical currents", published in German in Berlin in 1917. During the first World War he was deported to Bihać for labor because of his pro-Yugoslav orientation. In 1918 Dvorniković arrives in Zagreb where he works in a Musical school.

In 1919 he began lecturing at the University of Zagreb with the theme "Philosophy and Science." In 1925 he becomes a regular professor on the board of directors for the "theoretic and practical philosophy and for the history of philosophy." He is the fourth professor of philosophy in Croatia in half a century; his predecessors were Franjo Marković, Đuro Arnold and Albert Bazala. Rejecting, like Bazala, the old education-system scheme of Johann Friedrich Herbart, Dvorniković indulges himself in the search for proper philosophy, respectively referring to it as "our autochthonous philosophy." Not scrupling to participation in his public life and pronouncement tribunals about current societal and political themes. A strong proponent of "integrated Yugoslavism" (the concept of the Yugoslav Democratic Party), he is an opponent to political demagogy and to the regime of his time. As a result, in 1926 - only a year prior to becoming a regular professor, at age 38 becomes retired.

After his departure from the university, he becomes intensely active in public affairs. He recites over 400 lectures in public across all parts of united Yugoslavia, but also in Vienna, Prague, and Zurich. He annunciates discussions, various studies, essays, articles, displays, and criticisms. He moves to Belgrade and, after the establishment of the Sixth-of-January dictatorship, fully cooperates with the new regime. In 1933, he became the assistant of the ministry of education but is soon retired (in 1934). He authors the book "Battle of Ideas" in   1937, and then writes his most famous book in 1939, titled "Characterology of the Yugoslavs."

During the second World War he lives withdrawn in Belgrade. After the establishment of Communist Yugoslavia, he is enrolled as a member of the "Commission for the constructing appellation in architecture." He is a member from 1945 - 1950. He authors smaller articles regarding the history of culture, archeology, ethnology, and psychology. He was briefly involved in photography.

Dvorniković died in Belgrade, in what was at the time the People's Republic of Serbia, FPR Yugoslavia.

Yugoslav Characterology
Written in Serbo-Croatian (Karakterologija Jugoslavena), the book addresses the need to establish a national character within the entire country. Dvorniković writes that it is important to "mix" up all elements of Yugoslavia and to create one people (the Yugoslavs). He claims that Serbs and Croats can only survive as a strong nation by integrating into one people (like the unification of Germans and Germany or that of Italians and Italy).

The book did not dismiss the differences among people that inhabited Yugoslavia, but stressed that these differences were "contingent and temporary and that they mask a deeper and more profound racial unity". He also advocated the idea of a Dinaric race, and his book overall gives a comprehensive description of unitarist Yugoslav mythology.

Works
Along with other texts, he has published the following works:
Die beiden Grundtypen des Philosophierens, Berlin, 1918. (Oba osnovna tipa filozofiranja)
Savremena filozofija (2 sveska), Zagreb, 1919. i 1920.
Studije za psihologiju pesimizma (2 sveska), Zagreb, 1923. i 1924.
Psiha jugoslavenske melankolije, Zagreb, 1925. (2. prerađeno izdanje)
Tipovi negativizma, Zagreb, 1926.
T. G. Masaryk kao filozof i sociolog, Prag, 1927. (objavljeno na češkom i na "jugoslavenskom")
Borba ideja, Beograd, 1937.
Karakterologija Jugoslavena, Beograd, 1939.

References

Literature

Despot, Branko: Filozofija?", Zagreb: Demetra, 2000. ("Filozofiranje Vladimira Dvornikovića, str. 177–342)
Roksandić, Dragutin: Srpska i hrvatska povijest i "nova historija", Zagreb: Stvarnost, 1991. ("Karakterologija Jugoslavena Vladimira Dvornikovića i njezina recepcija u srpskoj i hrvatskoj kulturi (1939–1941)", str. 257–281.
Zenko, Franjo: Novija hrvatska filozofija, Zagreb: Školska knjiga, 1995. (str. 24–25)

External links
Karakterologija Jugoslovena - Chapter 13, dedicated to work (Serbian)

1888 births
1956 deaths
People from Vrbovsko
People from the Kingdom of Croatia-Slavonia
20th-century Croatian philosophers
Croatian philosophers
Croatian psychologists
People of the Kingdom of Yugoslavia
Yugoslav philosophers
Yugoslav psychologists
Academic staff of the University of Zagreb
20th-century psychologists